James Compton, 5th Earl of Northampton (2 May 1687 – 3 October 1754), known as Lord Compton from 1687 to 1727, was a British peer and politician.

Northampton was the eldest son of George Compton, 4th Earl of Northampton, and his wife Jane (née Fox). He was educated at Eton College and travelled on the continent from 1707 to 1709.

He was elected to the House of Commons for Warwickshire in 1710, a seat he held until the following year, when he was summoned to the House of Lords through a writ of acceleration in his father's junior title of Baron Compton. He was one of "Harley's Dozen" elevated to the Lords to support the Tory government's peace plans against strong Whig opposition.

He succeeded his father in 1727 and his uncle Hon. Spencer Compton, 1st Earl of Wilmington, in 1743. From the latter, he inherited Compton Place in Eastbourne.

Lord Northampton married Elizabeth, 15th Baroness Ferrers of Chartley, in 1716. He had no surviving sons and was succeeded in the barony of Compton, which could be passed on through female lines, by his daughter Lady Charlotte, who also succeeded her mother in the barony of Ferrers of Chartley. The earldom was passed on to his younger brother George.

Notes

References
Kidd, Charles, Williamson, David (editors). Debrett's Peerage and Baronetage (1990 edition). New York: St Martin's Press, 1990.

1687 births
1754 deaths
British MPs 1710–1713
05
06
James
Members of the Parliament of Great Britain for English constituencies
People educated at Eton College